This is a list of rugby teams in the Czech Republic, as per the 2009/2010 season.

KB Extraliga
RC Bystrc 
RC Dragon Brno
RK Petrovice
Praga Rugby
RC Říčany
RC Slavia Prague
RC Sparta Prague
RC Tatra Smíchov
RC Vyškov
RC Zlín

KB První Liga
RC Havířov
ARC Iuridica
RC Olomouc
Praga Rugby B
RC Přelouč
RC Slavia Prague B
TJ Sokol Mariánské Hory

Non-league
RC Písek
RK Strakonice

Rugby clubs
Czech